Jeanne Georgette Stunyo (born April 11, 1936) is a former world-class diver who earned a silver medal on the three-meter springboard at the 1956 Summer Olympics in Melbourne, Australia.

At those same Games, Irene MacDonald finished in third place to become Canada's first Olympic medalist in diving. Standing at the top of the awards podium was gold medalist Patricia McCormick of the United States.

Prior to her performance at the 1956 Olympics, Jeanne Stunyo was a three-meter springboard finalist at the 1952 US Olympic Trials; Jeanne also won a silver medal at the 1955 Pan-American Games in Mexico City.

Coached by four-time Olympian, Clarence Pinkston, Jeanne Stunyo and teammate Barbara Sue Gilders competed for the Detroit Athletic Club; Jeanne also attended the University of Detroit.

Stunyo was born in Gary, Indiana.

References

1936 births
American female divers
Divers at the 1956 Summer Olympics
Olympic silver medalists for the United States in diving
Sportspeople from Gary, Indiana
Living people
Medalists at the 1956 Summer Olympics
Pan American Games silver medalists for the United States
Pan American Games medalists in diving
Divers at the 1955 Pan American Games
Detroit Mercy Titans women's divers
Medalists at the 1955 Pan American Games